Altamont is a neighbourhood of the District of West Vancouver, British Columbia, Canada.

Named by John Fitzgerald Mahon ( - 1942) of Vancouver and London, who subdivided land here in 1913, after his brother-in-law's courtesy title, Earl of Altamont, the eldest son of the Marquess of Sligo, and brother of his wife, Lady Alice Mahon, Altamont is considered as one of the most desirable and prestigious neighbourhoods in all of West Vancouver and hence, Metro Vancouver. 

Although large trees often limit the views, the properties are extremely large, and there are some properties that are of an acre or greater in size which is extremely rare in Vancouver. Given the privacy, exclusivity and with a number of the best schools in the province (both public and private) in the neighbourhood, Altamont has attracted some of the wealthiest business people and entrepreneurs in British Columbia who have chosen to live there with their families.

See also
Altamont (disambiguation)

References

Neighbourhoods in West Vancouver